Lawrence J. Kafka (March 16, 1898 – August 3, 1977) was a member of the Wisconsin State Assembly.

Biography
Kafka was born on March 16, 1898, in New Denmark, Wisconsin. He died on August 3, 1977.

Career
Kafka defeated Alexander R. Grant in the 1964 Republican primary and then served as a member of the assembly from 1965 to 1972. In addition, he served as supervisor and chairman of New Denmark and a member and chairman of the Brown County, Wisconsin Board. He was a Republican.

References

People from New Denmark, Wisconsin
County supervisors in Wisconsin
1898 births
1977 deaths
20th-century American politicians
Republican Party members of the Wisconsin State Assembly